Katrin is a feminine given name. It is a German and Swedish contracted form of Katherine. Katrin may refer to:

Sports 

Katrin Apel (born 1973), German biathlete
Katrin Beinroth (born 1981), German judoka
Katrin Borchert (born 1969), German-born Australian sprint canoer
Katrín Davíðsdóttir (born 1993), Icelandic CrossFit athlete
Katrin Dörre-Heinig (born 1961), German long-distance runner
Katrin Engel (born 1984), Austrian handball player
Katrin Green (born 1985), German Paralympian track and field athlete 
Katrin Käärt (born 1983), Estonian athletics sprinter
Katrin Kauschke (born 1971), German field hockey player
Katrin Kieseler, German-born, Australian sprint canoer
Katrin Kliehm (born 1981), German football player
Katrin Krabbe (born 1969), German athlete
Katrin Krüger (born 1959), German handball player
Katrin Loo (born 1991), Estonian footballer 
Katrin Mattscherodt (born 1981), German long track speed skater
Katrin Meissner (born 1973), German freestyle swimmer
Katrin Olsen (born 1972), Danish–Faroese rower
Katrin Rutschow-Stomporowski (born 1975), German rower
Katrin Schreiter (born 1969), German sprinter
Katrin Wagner-Augustin (born 1977), German sprint canoer
Katrin Zeller (born 1979), German cross country skier

Television and film 

Katrin Cartlidge (1961–2002), British actress
Katrin Ottarsdóttir (born 1957), Faroese movie director
Katrin Karisma (born 1947), Estonian actress, singer and politician
Katrin Kohv (born 1964), Estonian actress
Katrin Laur (born 1955), Estonian film director, producer and screenwriter
Katrin Pärn (born 1977), Estonian actress
Katrin Sass (born 1956), German actress
Katrin Välbe (1904–1981), Estonian actress

Other fields 

Katrin Adt (born 1972), German business executive
Katrin Fridriks (born 1974), Icelandic artist
Katrin Göring-Eckardt (born 1966), German politician
Katrin Himmler (born 1969), German writer
Katrin Kivi (born 1967), Estonian diplomat
Katrin Koov (born 1973), Estonian architect
Katrin Nyman-Metcalf (born 1963), Estonian-Swedish legal scholar 
Katrin Saks (born 1956), Estonian politician
Katrin Siska (born 1983), Estonian musician
Katrin Wehrheim (born 1972), German-American mathematician

See also
KATRIN, experiment to measure the mass of the electron neutrino with sub-eV precision
Katherine 
Kathrin
Katrina 
Katrín
Catherine

References

Feminine given names
Estonian feminine given names
German feminine given names